The Buffalo mayoral election of 1997 took place on November 4, 1997 and resulted in incumbent mayor Anthony Masiello winning a second term over former mayor Jimmy Griffin and two other opponents.

Results

See also
 1997 United States elections

References

Buffalo
Mayoral elections in Buffalo, New York
Buffalo
November 1997 events in the United States